Gilet Velut was a French composer of the early Renaissance.

Life and career
In 1409 Velut  was likely a petit vicaire ('little vicar') at Cambrai Cathedral. He went with Charlotte of Bourbon to Cyprus in 1411.

Music
Vilet has been suggested as the composer for all secular music in the Codex Cyprius.

Works

Editions
Velut's work is included in the following collections:

Notes

References

Sources

External links
 

Year of birth unknown
Year of death unknown
15th-century French composers
French classical composers
French male classical composers